"Turn Back Time" is a song by British DJ and record producer Sub Focus, featuring uncredited vocals from British singer Yolanda Quartey. It was released independently on 20 December 2013 as the sixth single from his second studio album Torus. However, the song charted prior to independent release and continued to rise, peaking at number 10 on the UK Singles Chart for the week of 25 January 2014. Along with "Endorphins", it is his joint highest-charting single to date.

Background and release
"Turn Back Time" was one of the last songs to be finished on Torus. At the time he was experimenting with 90's rave samples and the song originally used a Todd Terry sample but was re-recorded with session vocalist Yolanda Quartey and worked into a new song. The song contains elements of the composition "Brass Disk", as written by Todd Terry and performed by Duprée, and lyrics from the song "Missing You", as performed by Kim English and produced by Frankie Feliciano. It is a fan favourite during his live sets, and one of the few songs that he uses the smoke machine during. The track received a surge in popularity upon the album release and entered the UK Singles Chart, working its way up to number 85 and then later number 35, number 15 and eventually number 10 on the UK Singles Chart.

Music video
An official video to accompany the release of the single was premiered on YouTube on 19 December 2013, at a total duration of three minutes and fifty-eight seconds.

Track listing

Credits and personnel

 Vocals – Yolanda Quartey
 Writers – Todd Terry, Kim English, Frankie Feliciano
 Producer – Nick Douwma
 Label – Virgin EMI Records, Mercury Records, RAM Records

Charts and certifications

Charts

Certifications

Release history

References

2013 songs
2013 singles
Sub Focus songs
Mercury Records singles
RAM Records singles
Songs written by Sub Focus